Evangelical Quarterly is an academic journal covering theology and biblical studies. It was established in 1929 by Donald Maclean and J. R. Mackay. The current editors are Richard Snoddy and John Nolland. The book reviews editor is Michael A. G. Haykin.

External links 
 

Protestant studies journals
Publications established in 1929
English-language journals
Quarterly journals